Papawera zelandiae, common name the white bubble shell, is a species of medium-sized sea snail or bubble snail, a marine opisthobranch gastropod mollusc in the family Haminoeidae, the bubble snails.

Systematics
The white bubble shell was in the past classified in the genus Haminoea. However, Oskars et al. (2019) placed this species and Haminoea maugeansis in the new genus Papawera after DNA-based cladistic analysis found both species closely related to Smaragdinella.

References

 Powell A. W. B., New Zealand Mollusca, William Collins Publishers Ltd, Auckland, New Zealand 1979 
 Glen Pownall, New Zealand Shells and Shellfish, Seven Seas Publishing Pty Ltd, Wellington, New Zealand 1979 

Haminoeidae
Gastropods of New Zealand
Gastropods described in 1843
Taxa named by John Edward Gray